Graeme Donald Snooks (born 1944 in Perth, Western Australia) is a systems theorist and stratologist who has developed a general dynamic theory to explain complex living systems. His resulting "dynamic-strategy theory" has been employed to analyse the fluctuating fortunes of life over the past 4,000 million years (myrs) and of human society over the past 2 myrs; to analyse contemporary economic problems (inflation, financial crises, climate change); to explore socio-political issues (population expansion, the emergence of democracy, the "clash of civilizations", disease (COVID-19) control, the failure of strategic leadership); to analyse the emergence, operation, and malfunction of the mind; and to make scientific predictions about the future. New discoveries emerging from Snooks' publications include: existential schizophrenia, strategic frustration, strategic selection, the growth-inflation curve, the strategy function, the logological constant (akin to the cosmological constant), the Snooks–Panov Vertical (or the singularity), technological paradigm shifts, the Solar Revolution, and, most importantly, the strategic logos. His body of work challenges the existing paradigms of orthodox (neo-classical) economics, climate-mitigation economics, Marxism, neo-Darwinism, evolutionary psychology, self-organisation theory, and all other supply-side systems.For twenty-one years, from 1989 to 2010, Snooks was the foundation Coghlan Research Professor of Economics in the Institute of Advanced Studies at the Australian National University. Currently he is the Executive Director of both the Institute of Global Dynamic Systems and IGDS Books in Canberra. He was educated at Mount Lawley Senior High School (1957–1961), the University of Western Australia (BEc, 1966; MEc, 1968), and the Australian National University (PhD, 1972). Snooks has been elected Fellow of the Australian Academy of Social Sciences (1991), Fellow of the Royal Historical Society (UK) (1990), and Fellow of the Russian Academy of Humanities (elected 2006, resigned in protest 2022).

Books and articles

Snooks has published 30 books, including: Depression and Recovery (1974), Domesday Economy (with J. McDonald) (1986), Economics Without Time (1993), Historical Analysis in Economics (1993), Portrait of the Family within the Total Economy (1994), Was the Industrial Revolution Necessary?, (1994), The Dynamic Society (1996), The Ephemeral Civilization (1997), The Laws of History (1998), Longrun Dynamics (1998), Global Transition (1999), The Global Crisis Makers (2000), The Collapse of Darwinism (2003), The Selfcreating Mind (2006), The Coming Eclipse, or The Triumph of Climate Mitigation Over Solar Revolution (2010), Dead God Rising. Religion and Science in the Universal Life-System (2010). The Death of Zarathustra. Notes on Truth for the Risk-Taker (2011), Ark of the Sun: the improbable voyage of life (November 2015), Ultimate Reality & its Dissidents (March 2016), Time's Gateway: a personal quest for ultimate reality (August 2017), and Great Myths to Die For: essays on the ship of metaphysical fools (February 2021).

Snooks' book, Ark of the Sun provides an overview of his thinking over five decades on the dynamics of life and human society and reveals the underlying reality of life – the strategic logos – which is the ultimate complex living system. Ultimate Reality & its Dissidents provides a unique philosophy of life based on his realist general dynamic theory. Time's Gateway shows how these ideas emerged over the past fifty years. And Great Myths to Die For shows how the metaphysical interventionists are undermining the survival of human civilization. He is currently researching the contribution of DNA testing to the exploration of societal dynamics over the past 60,000 years.

Articles on the theory of complex living systems have been published by Snooks in Advances in Space Research (2005), Complexity (the journal of the Santa Fe Institute) (2008), and Social Evolution & History (2002, 2005, 2007). In a November 2016 article – "The Triumph of Trump and the failure of the intellectuals" – he applies the dynamic-strategy theory to the recent US Presidential election and provides suggestions for the type of dynamic strategy that the USA would need to pursue in order to "make America great again" and to position itself at the forefront of a forthcoming technological paradigm shift. Snooks's most recent articles include: "Exploding the great singularity myth" (February 2019), which critically examines the futuristic concept known as the technological singularity – an issue that he first addressed in his 1996 book The Dynamic Society; "Exploding the Great Climate Mitigation Myth" (May 2019), which claims that the impact of the economic interventions to address climate change have been grossly underestimated; "Fight the Virus (COVID-19), Not the Economy! How to Avoid the 'Interventionist Storm'" (March 2020), which discusses the dangers of complete economic shut-down; "COVID-19 and the Great Lockdown Fiasco" (April 2020), which claims that the emerging 'lockdown depression' is the outcome of a failure of strategic leadership in Western Civilization that has been emerging since the late 20th century; and "Will the world ever recover from the Great Lockdown? Counting the costs of waging war on the economy", which estimates and analyses the impact of massive government intervention on world real GDP and GDP per capita in both the short and long term. In 2022 Snooks published a series of papers on the philosophical implications of his dynamic-strategy theory and his discovery of the strategic logos.

See also
 Big History
 Complex systems

References

Further reading
 For further details see : together with Who's Who in Australia, and Marquis Who's Who in the World.
 Gary B. Magee, "As big as it gets: 'Big Theory' and The Collapse of Darwinism", in Social Evolution & History, vol. 5, no. 1, March 2006, pp. 164 – 174.
 Big History or Big Theory. Uncovering the Laws of Life Social Evolution & History. Vol. 4, no. 1, 2005. Special Issue. Exploring the Horizons of Big History
 Akop Nazaretyan, "Snooks-Panov Vertical", The Encyclopaedia of Global Science, ed. I.I. Mazow and A.N. Chumakov, Moscow: Dialog Raduga Publishers, 2005.
 Graeme Donald Snooks, Time's Gateway: A personal quest for ultimate reality (IGDS Books, 2017).

 Graeme Donald Snooks, "Exploding the Great Singularity Myth". IGDS Working Papers #16, February 2019.
 Graeme Donald Snooks, "Is Singularity a Scientific Concept, or the Construct of Metaphysical Historicism? Implications for Big History", IGDS Working Papers # 17, February 2019.
 Graeme Donald Snooks, "Fight the Virus (COVID-19), Not the Economy! How to Avoid the 'Interventionist storm'", IGDS Working Papers, #19, March 2020.
 Graeme Donald Snooks, "COVID-19 and the Great Lockdown Fiasco", IGDS Working Papers, #20. April 2020.
 Graeme Donald Snooks, "Will the world ever recover from the Great Lockdown? Counting the costs of waging war on the economy", IGDS Working Papers'' # 21. May 2020.
Graeme Donald Snooks, "Is singularity a scientific concept, or the metaphysical construct of historicism? Implications for Big History". In: Andrey V. Korotayev & David J. LePoire (eds), The 21st Century Singularity and Global Futures: A Big History Perspective (Springer, 2020)

Complex systems scientists
Living people
1944 births
Australian economists
Big History
Non-Darwinian evolution
People educated at Mount Lawley Senior High School
People from Perth, Western Australia
Scientists from Western Australia
University of Western Australia alumni
Australian National University alumni
Fellows of the Academy of the Social Sciences in Australia
Fellows of the Royal Historical Society